Mexicana Universal Quintana Roo is a pageant in Quintana Roo, Mexico, that selects that state's representative for the national Mexicana Universal pageant.

No State Representative was sent in 2001, 2004, 2008, 2010, 2012 and 2013.

The State Organization hasn't had a national winner in Nuestra Belleza México.

Titleholders
Below are the names of the annual titleholders of Mexicana Universal Quintana Roo, listed in ascending order, and their final placements in the Mexicana Universal after their participation, until 2017 the names are as Nuestra Belleza Quintana Roo.

1Lilián Villanueva was chosen to represent Mexico in the 2001 Miss International pageant, but didn't compete because Nuestra Belleza México temporarily lost the franchise to send representatives to Miss International that year.
 Competed in another International Pageant.

 Competed in Miss Universe.
 Competed in Miss International.
 Competed in Miss Charm International.
 Competed in Miss Continente Americano.
 Competed in Reina Hispanoamericana.
 Competed in Miss Orb International.
 Competed in Nuestra Latinoamericana Universal.

External links
Official Website

Nuestra Belleza México
Beauty pageants in Mexico
Mexican awards
1994 establishments in Mexico
Quintana Roo